Actinanthus is a monospecific genus which contains only the species Actinanthus syriacus Ehrenb.. It is native to Syria and Lebanon.

References

Apiaceae
Monotypic Apiaceae genera
Taxa named by Christian Gottfried Ehrenberg